The 1922 WAFL season was the 38th season of the West Australian Football League. It saw East Perth equal East Fremantle's feat of winning four consecutive premierships, this time against a rejuvenated West Perth team which had a lean period since 1912. Their most notable feat during the season was a record comeback against South Fremantle, but on an August tour of the Eastern States the Royals also defeated SANFL premiers Norwood by the score of 8.20 (68) to 7.10 (52) and runners-up West Adelaide by 11.12 (78) to 7.12 (54), after having lost by a point to St. Kilda two weeks beforehand. A consequence of their trip – hastily planned when Subiaco's tour there was cancelled during July – was that their last round match with wooden-spooner Perth was never played – a cancellation to be repeated the following season.

1922 also saw a dispute with the City of Perth during late June and early July over charges for use of the WACA and Leederville Oval, which led to proposals to play the season's WAFL finals at Claremont Showground, which had not been used for WAFL matches since 1907. Unlike a similar dispute during 1940 that affected the whole season at Leederville and Perth Oval, however, this dispute only affected a single round of matches, and was resolved before Round 11.

Home-and-away season

Round 1

Round 2

Round 3

Round 4

Round 5 (Foundation Day)

Round 6

Round 7

Round 8

Round 9

Round 10

Round 11

Round 12

Round 13

Round 14

Fitzroy Tour

Round 15

Ladder

Finals

First semi-final

Second semi-final

Final

Grand Final

Notes
One goal by West Perth kicked off the ground from a pack did not have the scorer identified.

References

External links
Official WAFL website
West Australian Football League (WANFL), 1922

West Australian Football League seasons
WAFL